Torkild Brakstad (20 September 1945 – 14 May 2021) was a Norwegian football player and manager.

Brakstad played as a central defender for his hometown team Molde FK from 1962 to 1978. Between 1974 and 1978, while Molde was in the Norwegian Premier League, Brakstad played 108 matches and scored 12 goals. Brakstad was capped three times on the Norwegian national team in 1974.

Brakstad acted as playing manager of Molde FK from 1969 to 1974 and in 1976 and as a manager from 1980 and 1981 and in 1986. He was also manager of Tromsø IL 1983–1984 and of Rosenborg BK 1986.

Personal life
He was the brother of former Molde player and coach Erik Brakstad.

He died on 14 May 2021 in his hometown Molde.

References

1945 births
2021 deaths
Norwegian football managers
Norwegian footballers
Association football central defenders
Norway international footballers
Eliteserien players
Molde FK players
People from Molde
Molde FK managers
Rosenborg BK managers
Tromsø IL managers
Sportspeople from Møre og Romsdal